Michael Freund is an American-born Israeli political activist and non-profit executive who advocates on behalf of individuals and groups who self-identify as Jews or would-be Jews, including self-described descendants of the Lost tribes of Israel, crypto-Jews, hidden Jews, and Jews forcibly assimilated under Communist rule, and converts to Judaism, attempting to regularize their legal status as Jews under Israeli law and secure permission for them to immigrate to Israel under the Law of Return. He founded the organization Shavei Israel.

Childhood and education
Freund grew up on the Upper East Side of Manhattan and attended the Ramaz School and Princeton. He spent a post-college year in Israel, studying in a yeshiva and working part-time for the concert pianist and journalist David Bar-Illan. He returned to New York as a speechwriter and aide with the Israeli Mission to the United Nations, then went on to earn a graduate degree in business administration from Columbia University.

Freund made aliyah in 1995.

Freund is the son of Harry Freund, co-founder of the merchant-banking firm Balfour Investors and grandson of Miriam Freund-Rosenthal, a former President of Hadassah Women's Zionist Organization of America.

Early career
Freund worked for a year with a short-lived NGO called Peace Watch, a right-of-center group monitoring the Oslo Accords. When Peace Watch closed, he took a job with the Sapanut Bank in Tel Aviv, work he did not enjoy. In 1996, he became the deputy director of communications under Prime Minister Binyamin Netanyahu. After Netanyahu lost the 1999 election to Ehud Barak, Freund took a job with Ruder Finn, a Jerusalem public relations firm. At some point, backed by family money, he left his job in public relations to devote himself to the work of "returning lost" Jewish groups to Israel.

Shavei Israel
Freund was introduced to the cause that would shape his career while working for the Prime Minister, when he read a letter from the Bnei Menashe community of eastern India, a group that claims descent from the lost Israelite tribe of Menashe. In the letter, they pleaded with the Prime Minister to enable them to make aliyah. He became involved through the bureaucracy in arranging for large numbers of Bnei Menashe to make Aliya.

Freund began to work with Rabbi Eliyahu Avichail whose organization Amishav was founded in 1975 to help "lost" Jews "return" to Israel, splitting with him to found Shavei Israel in 2002. He became the largest funder of Shavei Israel.

According to Freund, the Bnei Menashe and similar groups "constitute a large, untapped demographic and spiritual reservoir for Israel and the Jewish people.”

References

American emigrants to Israel
American nonprofit chief executives
American political activists
American social activists
American speechwriters
Businesspeople from New York City
Columbia Business School alumni
Israeli bankers
Israeli Jews
Israeli non-fiction writers
Israeli political activists
Jewish activists
Jewish American bankers
Jewish American writers
Princeton University alumni
Writers from Manhattan
Living people
Year of birth missing (living people)
People from the Upper East Side
21st-century American Jews